Rosa's Cantina may refer to:
"Rosa's Cantina", a song by David Cassidy from his 1976 album Gettin' It in the Streets
"Rosa's Cantina", a song by Deep Purple from their 1996 album Purpendicular